Supermicelle is a hierarchical micelle structure (supramolecular assembly) where individual components are also micelles. Supermicelles are formed via bottom-up chemical approaches, such as self-assembly of long cylindrical micelles into radial cross-, star- or dandelion-like patterns in a specially selected solvent; solid nanoparticles may be added to the solution to act as nucleation centers and form the central core of the supermicelle. The stems of the primary cylindrical micelles are composed of various block copolymers connected by strong covalent bonds; within the supermicelle structure they are loosely held together by hydrogen bonds, electrostatic or solvophobic interactions.

References

Supramolecular chemistry
Colloidal chemistry